The Persian Gulf Residency was an official colonial subdivision (i.e., residency) of the British Raj from 1763 until 1947 (and remained British protectorates after Indian independence in 1947, up to 1971), whereby the United Kingdom maintained varying degrees of political and economic control over several states in the Persian Gulf, including what is today known as the United Arab Emirates (formerly called the "Trucial States") and at various times southern portions of Persia, Bahrain, Kuwait, Oman, and Qatar.

Historical background until 1900
British interest in the Persian Gulf originated in the sixteenth century and steadily increased as British India's importance rose in the imperial system of the eighteenth and nineteenth centuries. In the beginning, the agenda was primarily of a commercial character. Realizing the region's significance, the British fleet supported the Persian emperor Shāh Abbās in expelling the Portuguese from Hormuz Island in 1622. In return, the British East India Company ("the Company") was permitted to establish a trading post in the coastal city of Bandar 'Abbās, which became their principal port in the Persian Gulf.  Empowered by the charter of Charles II in 1661, the Company was responsible for conducting British foreign policy in the Persian Gulf, as well as concluding various treaties, agreements and engagements with Persian Gulf states in its capacity as the Crown's regional agent.

In 1763, the British East India Company established a residency at Bushehr, on the Persian side of the Gulf: this was followed by another residency in Basar several years later. The arrival in Persia in 1807 of a large French mission under General Gardane galvanized the British, both in London and Calcutta. They responded by sending a mission under Sir Harford Jones, which resulted in establishing the Preliminary Treaty of Friendship and Alliance with the Shah in 1809. Despite being modified during subsequent negotiations, this treaty provided the framework within which Anglo–Persian foreign relations operated for the next half century. Britain appointed Harford Jones as their first resident envoy to the Persian court in 1808. Until the appointment of Charles Alison as Minister in Tehran in 1860, the envoy and his staff were, with rare exceptions, almost exclusively recruited from the East India Company.

In the absence of formal diplomatic relations, the political resident conducted all necessary negotiations with Persian authorities and was described by Sir George Curzon as "the Uncrowned King of the Persian Gulf." Whether Persia liked it or not, the political resident had at his disposal naval forces with which to suppress piracy, slave trading, and gun running, and to enforce quarantine regulations; he also could, and did, put landing parties and punitive expeditions ashore on the Persia coast. In 1822, the Bushehr and Basar residencies were combined, with Bushehr serving as headquarters for the new position of "British Resident for the Persian Gulf." A chief political resident was the chief executive officer of the political unit, and he was subordinate to the governor of Bombay until 1873 and the viceroy of India until 1947, when India became independent. In 1858, the East India Company’s agency was transferred to the Indian Raj, who assumed authority of British foreign policy with Persian Gulf states: this responsibility went to the Foreign Office on 1 April 1947.

The Trucial States

British activity in the Persian Gulf was primarily a commercial pursuit. Thus, the British Raj was slow to take action in protecting British and Indian shipping against raids from Qawasim pirates. By 1817, the Qawasim were spreading terror along the Indian coast to within 70 miles of Bombay. This threat generated a British military expedition in 1819, which crushed the Qawasim confederation and resulted in ratification of the General Maritime Treaty on 5 January 1820. Through extension and modification, this treaty formed the basis of British policy in the Persian Gulf for a century and half. The ruler of Bahrain as well as sheikhs along the northern coast of Oman pledged to maintain peace between their tribes and Britain and accepted clauses prohibiting slavery and cruel treatment of prisoners. The treaty further stipulated that the ships of maritime tribes would be freely admitted at British ports. While the treaty obviously served British interests, because it was sensibly magnanimous and aimed at securing all parties' interests, it effectively ended piracy in the Persian Gulf. Articles 6 and 10 authorized the British Residency in the Persian Gulf to act as maritime police to administer the treaty's conditions and resolve tribal disputes. Article 7 condemned piracy among Arab tribes and implied a British obligation to maintain peace. The trucial system took explicit form in 1835, when raids by Bani Yas tribesmen, rivals of the Qawasim, led to a British-imposed truce during the summer pearling season. The truce was made year-long in 1838 and renewed annually until 1843 when it was extended for ten years.

The trucial system received formal permanency with the "1853 Treaty of Maritime Peace in Perpetuity." The British policy of non-involvement in the internal affairs of the Trucial sheikhs was abandoned with passage of the "Exclusive Agreement" in March 1892. This agreement prohibited the Trucial rulers from yielding territorial sovereignty without British consent. Britain, moreover, assumed responsibility for foreign relations and thus, by implication, their protection. This treaty marked Britain's shift from commercial to strategic priorities and formed the diplomatic pillar of British authority in the Trucial states.

Post World War I
In the years following World War I, the Trucial sheikhs found their capacity to act independently being continuously curtailed by the British. This was partially a result of Britain shifting attention away from Iran, where Reza Shah's nationalist assertion of power undercut their hegemony. It also reflected growing commercial and imperial communications interests, such as air route facilities. For example, according to agreements concluded in February 1922, the Trucial sheikhs pledged themselves not to allow the exploitation of oil resources in their territories except by "persons appointed by the British government". Even more restrictive was the ultimatum issued by the political resident in 1937 requiring Trucial states to do business exclusively with Petroleum Concessions Ltd., a wholly owned subsidiary of the London-based Iraq Petroleum Company, which was itself partly owned by the Anglo-Iranian Oil Company (AIOC). Instead of reflecting higher demand for oil (England then had adequate supply), this ultimatum was designed to block other parties out of the economic and political affairs of the Trucial States.

In 1946, the Persian Gulf residency left its location in Bushehr and relocated to a new base in Bahrain. However, while Reza Shah succeeded in removing Britain from Iranian territory, his efforts to curtail their role in the Iranian oil industry backfired, and led to an extension of the concession operated by the British government-owned Anglo-Iranian Oil Company. From their new base in Bahrain, the British resident directed other political agents in Bahrain, Kuwait, Qatar and Oman until those regions became independent.

Duties of the Residency
On 1 April 1947, the British political residency came under the authority of the Foreign Office, 'graded' as an ambassador in the Persian Gulf. The political resident accomplished his obligations by using a network of representatives known as political agents, operating in Bahrain, Qatar, Dubai and Abu Dhabi. Additionally, political officers were retained for the remaining Trucial states, acting under the British Agency at Dubai. Foreign relations in Muscat were conducted by a Consul-General, who was also, administratively, answerable to the resident in Bahrain. Through his political agents the resident preserved close connections with Persian Gulf rulers – simultaneously protecting their political and economic interests and the British government's on the basis of established treaties and agreements. According to Rupert Hay, the sheikhs enjoyed control over internal affairs, with Britain "ordinarily only exercises control in matters involving negotiations or the possibility of complications with foreign powers, such as civil aviation, posts and telegraphs." However, Hay added that "constant advice and encouragement are… offered to various rulers regarding improvement of their administrations and development of their resources, mostly in an informal manner".

The resident also administered British extraterritorial jurisdiction, which had been exercised in certain Persian Gulf territories since 1925. Extraterritorial jurisdiction was ceded to Britain in the 19th century by virtue of informal agreements with various rulers. In Muscat it was based on formal agreements that were renewed periodically. Extraterritorial jurisdiction was originally applied to all resident classes in Persian Gulf states, but was later limited to British subjects, Commonwealth nationals and non-Muslim foreigners. Britain relinquished extraterritorial jurisdiction in Kuwait on 4 May 1961, transferring jurisdiction over all classes of foreigners to Kuwaiti courts. British extraterritorial jurisdiction in the Persian Gulf was implemented in accordance with the British Foreign Jurisdiction Acts of 1890–1913, which empowered the Crown to establish courts and legislate for the categories of persons subject to jurisdiction by means of Orders in Council.

Regarding the resident's role in concluding concession agreements between rulers and foreign oil companies, Hay says: 'The oil companies naturally bulk largely in the political resident's portfolio. He has to closely watch all negotiations for new agreements or the amendment of existing agreements and ensure that nothing is decided which will seriously affect the position or the rulers of the British government…' The same author also refers to what he terms political agreements, to which, he says, oil companies’ are all bound… with the British government… in addition to their concession agreements with the rulers…' 'One of the main objects of these', he continues, 'is to ensure that their relations with the rulers in all matters of importance are conducted through, or with, the knowledge of British political officers'.

Protectorates under the Residency
 Trucial States, precursor of the United Arab Emirates (1820–1971)
 Bahrain (1861–1971)
 Muscat and Oman (limited protectorate and intervention in internal affairs, 1892–1971)
 Kuwait (1899–1961)
 Qatar (1916–1971)

Chronology: 1763–1971
1763: British Residency established at Bušehr in Persia by the British East India Company.
1798: Sultan of Muscat signed a treaty giving the British East India Company exclusive trading rights, in return for an annual British stipend.
1809: Preliminary Treaty of Friendship and Alliance is concluded between Britain and the shah. While modified in subsequent negotiations (Definitive Treaty of Friendship and Alliance, 1812; Treaty of Tehran, 1814), remained the framework of Anglo–Persian relations over the next half century.
8 Jan 1820 – 15 March 1820: General Maritime Treaty with Britain and sheikhs in the "Trucial Coast States" and Bahrain, abolishing slave trade and forbidding piracy and warfare between the states (This last point was never fully implemented).
1822: Persian Gulf residency established by Britain.
1822 – 1873: Subordinated to the Governor of Bombay.
1835: Treaty with the Trucial States, installing a truce of six months a year, during the pearling season.
1843: Treaty renews the treaty of 1835 for ten years.
1853: Treaty with Trucial States, renewing the treaty of 1835 for an unlimited time period.
1856 – 1857: Anglo-Persian War and proclamation of jihad by Nasereddin Shah.
1858:  Act of 1858 is passed, transferring powers of the East India Company to the British government of India.
1861: Protectorate treaty with Bahrain (completed by treaties of 2 December 1880 and 1892).
1873 – 1947: Subordinate to British India (from 1946 resident in Bahrain).
1873: Trucial states start being administered by the British.
8 Mar 1892 – 1 December 1971: Informal protectorate with Muscat and Oman, and a formal protectorate with the Trucial States. This new agreement includes the sheikhs giving the British effective control over foreign policy: British offer military protection in return.
1899: Protectorate treaty with Kuwait (completed 3 November 1914).
1906: Constitutional Revolution in Arabia.
3 Nov 1916: Protectorate treaty with Qatar.
1920: Treaty of Seeb is signed recognizing the independence of the imamate of Oman.
1939: British residency established in the Trucial States at Dubai.
1946: Headquarters of the Persian Gulf residency is moved from Bushehr to Manama.
1947: With Indian independence imminent, the Persian Gulf Residency is transferred to the control of the British Foreign Office.
1961: Termination of protectorate over Kuwait and its complete independence.
1962: Great Britain declares Muscat and Oman an independent nation.
Jan 1968: Britain announces its decision to withdraw from the Persian Gulf, including the Trucial States, by 1971.
16 Dec 1971: Termination of British protectorate and military presence in the Persian Gulf.

Political Agents
Agents:

1763 – 1812 :                ....
c.1798 :                     Mirza Mahdi Ali Khan
c.1810 :                     Hankey Smith
1812 – 1822 :                William Bruce (acting to 1813)

Chief political residents of the Persian Gulf : 
(for Bahrain, Kuwait, Oman, Qatar, and the Trucial States)
1822 – 1823 :                John Macleod
1823 – 1827 :                Ephraim Gerrish Stannus
1827 – 1831 :                David Wilson
1831 – 1835 :                David Alexander Blane
1835 – 1838 :                James Morrison
1838 – 1852 :                Samuel Hennell
1852 – 1856 :                Arnold Burrowes Kemball
1856 – 1862 :                James Felix Jones
1862 :                       Herbert Frederick Disbrowe (acting)
1862 – 1872:                 Lewis Pelly
1872 – 1891:                 Edward Charles Ross
1891 – 1893 :                Adelbert Cecil Talbot
1893 :                       Stuart Hill Godfrey (acting)
1893 :                       James Hayes Sadler (1st time)(acting)
1893:                        James Adair Crawford (acting)
1893 – 1894 :                James Hayes Sadler (2nd time)(acting)
1894 – 1897 :                Frederick Alexander Wilson
1897 – 1900 :                Malcolm John Meade
1900 – 1904 :                Charles Arnold Kemball (acting)
1904 – 1920:                 Percy Zachariah Cox
- Acting for Cox -
1913 – 1914 :                John Gordon Lorimer
1914 :                       Richard Lockinton Birdwood
1914 :                       Stuart George Knox (1st time)
1915 :                       Stuart George Knox (2nd time)
1915 – 1917 :                Arthur Prescott Trevor (1st time)
1917 – 1919 :                John Hugo Bill
1919 :                       Cecil Hamilton Gabriel
1919 – 1920:                 Arthur Prescott Trevor (2nd time)
1920:                         Arnold Talbot Wilson (acting)
1920 – 1924 :                 Arthur Prescott Trevor
1924 – 1927 :                 Francis Bellville Prideaux
1927 – 1928 :                 Lionel Berkeley Holt Haworth
1928 – 1929 :                 Frederick William Johnston
1929  :                       Cyril Charles Johnson Barrett (acting)
1929 – 1932:                  Hugh Vincent Biscoe
1932 – 1939:                  Trenchard Craven William Fowle
1939 – 1946:                  Charles Geoffrey Prior
1946 – 1953:                  Rupert Hay (from 1952, Sir Rupert)
1953 – 1958:                  Bernard Burrows (from 1955, Sir Bernard)
1958 – 1961:                  Sir George Middleton
1961 – 1966:                  Sir William Henry Tucker Luce
1966 – 1970:                  Sir Robert Stewart Crawford
1970 – 15 August 1971:        Sir Geoffrey Arthur

See also 

 Pax Britannica
 Bahrain Province

Further reading
Blyth, Robert J., The Empire of the Raj
Shadle, Robert (1991), Historical Dictionary of European Imperialism. Greenwood Press, pp 409
G. Lucas, "Memorandum on the Cultivation and Exportation of Opium in Persia," Annual Report on the Administration of the Persian Gulf Residency from the Year 1874–75, pp. 26–30.
G. Lucas, "Memorandum on the Cultivation of Opium in Persia," Annual Report on the Administration of the Persian Gulf Residency from the Year 1878–79, pp. 31–39.
Dr. H. al-Baharna LL.B (1998). British Extra-Territorial Jurisdiction in the Gulf 1913–1971
Mehr, Farhang. A Colonial Legacy: The Dispute Over the Islands of Abu Musa, and the Greater and Lesser Tumbs, University Press of America
Onley, James. The Persian frontier of the British Raj
Albaharna, Husain M., (1968). Legal Status of the Persian Gulf States: Study of Their Treaty Relations and Their International Problems
British Residency in Persian Gulf

Notes

References

External links
 Qatar Digital Library - an online portal providing access to previously undigitised British Library archive materials relating to Gulf history and Arabic science

Residencies of British India
1763 establishments in Asia
1971 disestablishments in Asia
18th century in Iran
19th century in Iran
20th century in Iran
19th century in Bahrain
20th century in Bahrain
History of Kuwait
History of Dubai
19th century in Dubai
20th century in Dubai
Bahrain–United Kingdom relations
Iran–United Kingdom relations
Kuwait–United Kingdom relations
Oman–United Kingdom relations
Qatar–United Kingdom relations
United Arab Emirates–United Kingdom relations
Trucial States
18th-century establishments in the British Empire
Extraterritorial jurisdiction